Mardakan Castle may refer to:
 Quadrangular castle (Mardakan)
 Round Castle (Mardakan)